Island Arena is a broad valley occupied by a lateral lobe of the Darwin Glacier, Antarctica, indenting the north side of the Darwin Mountains between Colosseum Ridge and Kennett Ridge. An islandlike nunatak, Richardson Hill, rises above the ice of the valley. The descriptive name was given by the Victoria University of Wellington Antarctic Expedition (1962–63).

References

Landforms of Oates Land
Valleys of Antarctica